Island of the Amazons is a 1960 West German adventure film directed by Otto Meyer and starring Adrian Hoven, Ann Smyrner and Jan Hendriks.

In the United States it was released with the alternative title of Seven Daring Girls.

Cast
 Adrian Hoven as Manuel
 Ann Smyrner as Liz
 Jan Hendriks as Murdok
 Dorothee Parker as Colette
 Beatrice Norden as Trixi
 Kurt E. Ludwig as Muhazzin
 Demeter Bitenc as Leblanc
 Janez Skof as
 Dora Carras as Sonja
 Karin Heske as Katrin
 Brigitte Riedle
 Nina Semona as Merci
 Slavo Schweiger as Felipe

References

Bibliography 
 Bergfelder, Tim. International Adventures: German Popular Cinema and European Co-Productions in the 1960s. Berghahn Books, 2005.

External links 
 

1960 films
1960 adventure films
German adventure films
West German films
1960s German-language films
Seafaring films
Films set on islands
Films set in the Mediterranean Sea
Films about vacationing
1960s German films